John Foster or Forster (by 1511 – 1558), of Bramfield, Hertfordshire, was an English politician.

He was a Member (MP) of the Parliament of England for Shaftesbury in 1555 and Hertfordshire in 1558.

References

1558 deaths
Members of the Parliament of England for Hertfordshire
People from East Hertfordshire District
English MPs 1555
English MPs 1558
Year of birth uncertain